

The Anderson EA-1 Kingfisher is a US two-seat amphibious aircraft designed and marketed for homebuilding. It was the work of Earl William Anderson, a Pan Am airline captain, who flew the prototype on 24 April 1969. By 1978, 200 sets of kits for the plane had been sold, and 100 Kingfishers were reported to be under construction. The aircraft is a shoulder-wing monoplane with a flying boat hull and outrigger pontoons. On land, it uses retractable tailwheel undercarriage.  The single engine with a tractor propeller is mounted in a nacelle above the wing.  Some builders utilize the wings from a Piper Cub rather than making their own.

The planes were later marketed by Richard Warner Aviation before becoming the Wings Unlimited Kingfisher in the late 1990s. A variant with improved performance is known as the 'Super Kingfisher'.

Specifications (original configuration)

See also

References

Further reading
 
 anderson-kingfisher.com

1960s United States civil utility aircraft
Amphibious aircraft
Homebuilt aircraft
Single-engined tractor aircraft
Aircraft manufactured in the United States
High-wing aircraft
Aircraft first flown in 1969
Flying boats